Pride in London is an annual LGBT pride festival and parade held each summer in London, England. The event, which was formerly run by Pride London, is sometimes referred to as London Pride.

Pride in London celebrates the diversity of the LGBTQ (lesbian, gay, bisexual, transgender, queer) communities with the colourful Pride in London Parade, as well as the free festivity events that take place in Trafalgar Square. This event brings together thousands of people of all genders, ethnicities, sexualities, and also many people of different races.

It is one of the longest running in the country and attracts an estimated 1.5 million visitors to the city. The festival's events and location within London vary every year however the Pride parade is the only annual event to close London's iconic Oxford Street. The 2015 Gay Pride Parade through the streets of London attracted 1 million people, making it the 7th largest gay event in the world and the largest Gay Pride Parade and Gay event ever held in the UK, and the 2019 Pride attracted over 1.5 million people, making it the biggest Pride in the UK.

History 

Pride has been organised by several organisations since the first official UK Gay Pride Rally which was held in London on 1 July 1972 (chosen as the nearest Saturday to the anniversary of the Stonewall riots of 1969) with approximately 2,000 participants. The first marches took place in November 1970 with 150 men walking through Highbury Fields in North London.

In 1981, the usual Pride march and rally was not held in London, decamping to Huddersfield instead as an act of solidarity with the Yorkshire gay community who claimed that West Yorkshire Police were harassing them by repeatedly raiding the Gemini Club, a leading nightclub in the North of England at the time.

In 1985 representatives from mining groups joined the Lesbians and Gays Support the Miners group (LGSM) on the march. This was in recognition of the support given to striking miners by LGSM.

The controversy of Section 28 from 1988 led to numbers increasing on the march in protest.

Since 1983 the march was called "Lesbian and Gay Pride" and by the 1990s it had become more of a carnival event, with large park gatherings and a fair after the marches. For 1996, following a vote by the members of the Pride Trust, the event was renamed "Lesbian, Gay, Bisexual and Transgender Pride" and became the largest free music festival in Europe.

In 1992, London was selected to hold the first Europride with attendance put at 100,000; London again held Europride in 2006 with an estimated 600,000 participants.

In 1998, the Pride Trust became insolvent and no event was organised that year, it was believed by some that the decision to make it a ticket only event played a role in the 1998 event not happening.

For the next few years, another commercial organisation ran what it called 'London Mardi Gras' before it failed to pay its bill for the use of Hyde Park and was unable to run any more events without clearing that debt.

'Pride London' was formed in 2004, since then a political rally in Trafalgar Square has been held straight after the parade, and more recently Pride London has organised several other events in the centre of London on Pride Day including the Big Gay Out music festival in Finsbury Park in 2004, and in 2006 'Drag Idol' in Leicester Square, a women's stage in Soho and a party in Soho Square.

In 2004, it was awarded registered charity status.

The 2012 event was WorldPride, though this was to be the last event organised by Pride London.

In late 2012, a group of individuals from within the LGBTQ community formed London LGBT+ Community Pride, a registered community interest company, and the company organised the Pride in London festival and parade in 2013. The organisation has been awarded a contract to organise Pride in London for five years by the Greater London Authority, together with funding of £500,000 over five years.

The first International Asexual Conference was held at the 2012 World Pride in London.

Recent Events

2022 - #AllOurPride 
After two years of cancelled events due to COVID-19 restrictions, The 2022 parade occurred on 2 July 2022. 2022 marked the 50th anniversary of the inaugural Pride march within London organised by the Gay Liberation Front in 1972. The 2022 parade was led by members of the GLF who had attended the 1972 parade.

2021 (Cancelled) 

On 26 February 2021, it was announced that Pride in London will be going ahead on the weekend of 11 September 2021.

In August 2021, the event was cancelled in full due to COVID-19, stating that final risk assessments would not allow the parade to be held. This is despite the lifting of most COVID-19 restrictions in England.

2020 - #YouMeUsWe (Cancelled) 
The 2020 parade was scheduled for 27 June 2020. In March 2020, it was postponed, with no new date announced, due to the COVID-19 pandemic. However, Gay rights activists from Clapham arranged a gathering on Clapham Common to celebrate Pride 2020. This gathering turned into a large party that was penned by BBC News as an illegal rave and was shut down by police at 11pm. 
During the day there were pop-up performances, temporary tattoos, sing alongs and rainbow flags. There were no arrests.

2019 – #PrideJubilee 

The 2019 parade occurred on 6 July. Following on from the 2018 anti-transgender protest, the organisation has committed to enhancing security for the event.

That same year, on Saturday, 6 July 2019 the UK would be celebrating Pride, as well as recognising the 50th anniversary of the Stonewall riots. That year, Pride will be a time to bring the LGBT+ community closer to its counterparts. The Pride parade would be used as a celebration of hope and unity to people of all genders, sexualities, and races. The theme for Pride in London 2019 is The Pride Jubilee.

The official London Pride 2019 song is Dance Like Nobody's watching by Finnish singer Saara Aalto.

2018 – #PrideMatters 
Pride in London ran its 2018 festival from 9 June until 7 July. The parade happened on 7 July consisting of around 30,000 participants, 500 groups and over 1 million attendees to the event. The event saw 4 stages hosted in Trafalgar Square, Leicester Square and Soho. The #PrideMatters theme followed on from a piece of research Pride in London did alongside YouGov with a nationwide consultation. The point of the theme was to show the discrimination the LGBT+ community continues to face on a daily basis, including hate crime and the requirement for continued social movement in support of LGBT rights and equality.

Anti-transgender protest controversy 

During the 2018 Pride London, eight anti-trans activists carrying banners claiming "transactivism erases lesbians" took the lead of the demonstration without authorisation. They were quickly criticised by numerous LGBT+ organisations. The organisers of Pride London were also criticised for not having taken measures to remove the trans-exclusionary activists from the march.

2017 – #LoveHappensHere 

2017 marked the 45th year of pride marches in London. The 2017 parade happened on 8 July and saw over 26,000 participants and around 300 groups. Following the London Bridge terror attacks, the parade was launched by members of the emergency services. The #LoveHappensHere campaign came in two parts, with the first phase drawing attention to stories of anti LGBT+ hate crime and the second phase in which a new set of stories is released focused on positive LGBT+ relationships and events within the London (to demonstrate that "Love Happens Here")

Following the 2017 event, Pride in London's community advisory board released a report heavily criticising the organisation for, amongst other items, a lack of attention to the bisexual and transgender part of the community as well as a breakdown in communication with UK Black Pride. Pride in London responded to the report in a press release where they expressed concern over the report's accuracy and balance.

2016 – #NoFilter 
In 2016, the festival ran for over two weeks, from 10 June to 26 June with the parade being on 25 June. In 2016, the parade route changed, starting from Portland Place and then heading down through Regent Street, Oxford Circus, Waterloo Place, Trafalgar Square and then dispersing in Whitehall. Up to one million people were expected to attend and the parade consisted over nearly 300 groups.

There was heightened security put in place for this event as the Orlando nightclub shooting had occurred earlier in the month. Following the attack, Pride in London reported a surge in support and said "it will be a celebration and commemoration. So many people have got in touch to say that they want to show their support after Orlando." A minute's silence was observed in remembrance.

2015 – #PrideHeroes 
In 2015, the celebrations ran from 21 to 28 June, with the parade on the 27th; the day after same sex marriage became legalised nationwide in the United States. The theme "Pride Heroes" was used to celebrate LGBT figures of the day and throughout history including computer scientist Alan Turing and a gay sports club The King's Cross Steelers.

There was controversy over the decision taken by Pride in London to disallow the UK Independence Party (UKIP)'s entry into the parade. Pride in London said, "This decision has been made after careful consultation in order to protect participants and ensure the event passes off safely and in the right spirit, it has not been made on a political basis". Despite the ban, UKIP supporters joined the parade with a banner of "Some gays are UKIP, get over it!", a reference to the continuing Stonewall "Get Over It" campaign.

2014 – #FreedomTo 
The pride week in 2014 ran from 22 to 29 June. The event took place in the months following the implementation of the Marriage (Same Sex Couples). The theme #FreedomTo was designed to be open to interpretation and inclusive of many possibilities, from "freedom to marry" to "freedom to be out on the pitch for gay footballers". A social media where people were asked to submit what #FreedomTo meant to them using an image of themselves with their message formed part of the first Pride in London advertising campaign. Celebrities and members of the LGBT+ community were also shown on adverts on the London Underground and London buses. The advertising campaign ran for 2 weeks prior to Pride on 28 June 2014.

2013 – Love (and Marriage) 
After a bidding process organised by the Mayor of London in October 2012,  the newly formed London LGBT+ Community Pride was awarded a five-year contract and a grant worth £650,000 in January to deliver the annual pride celebrations within London. The parade ran from Baker Street to Whitehall via Trafalgar Square. Around 150 groups marched within the parade. The theme "Love (and Marriage)" was chosen to coincide with MPs considering the Equal Marriage Bill.

London LGBT+ Community Pride 

London LGBT+ Community Pride was formed in August 2012 as a Community Interest Company (CIC) to deliver Pride in London. It was founded as such so that any surplus generated can only be reinvested in Pride in London events or distributed as grants to LGBT+ community groups. The current Exec Director is Christopher Joel-Deshields and the Board of Directors are Dan O'Gorman, Simon Jones  and Asad Shaykh.  

In addition to the Board, the organisation has a Community Advisory Board which was established as an advisory and scrutiny body to help meet its commitment to openness and transparency, to advise on questions of inclusivity and to act as a source of guidance on governance and operational issues that may arise.

Volunteers 

Pride also has over 200 core volunteers who work throughout the year on organising Pride. Pride work throughout the year to recruit volunteers to help steward Pride day. In 2019 Pride in London recruited over 1,000 volunteers to work on 28 June 2014. This was the largest volunteer team Pride has ever had.

Pride in London sponsors 
The headline sponsor for Pride in London in 2019 were Tesco. Other sponsors have included Barclays Bank, ASDA, CitiBank and Prudential and SAB Miller. The event is also supported by Mayor Of London.

DIVA Magazine is a long-running sponsor of the Women's Stage in Leicester Square.

Controversy 
In 2018, the parade was led by an anti-trans organisation who forced their way into the parade. This was widely condemned by LGBT+ organisations and community. The organisation continued to retain Martina Navratilova as a patron after commenting that the inclusion of transgender inclusion in sport is "insane and cheating". London Trans+ Pride, a separate pride march advocating for transgender rights, was founded in 2019 in response to the events of Pride in London 2018.

During March 2021 one of most senior volunteer, the Director of Communications, Rhammel Afflick resigned in what they described as "distinct disregard for black and brown LGBT+ communities over a period of years". On 18 March 2021 the entire Pride in London Community Advisory Board (CAB) resigned alleging both a culture of bullying and a hostile environment for people of colour. They cited "the increasing preoccupation at Pride in London with managing the public relations concerns of its leadership, at the cost of supporting its Black and POC volunteers or community members”. Throughout 2021 sponsors withdrew from the event based on this controversy

In October 2021 fourteen leading voices of the community wrote an open letter to the Mayor of London, who had previously called the organisation "a mess" and in need of a "reset and refresh how Pride in London is organised". The letter asked for intervention in the delivery of the event, including an investigation into bullying of volunteers, that directors make available a register of interests, and that the organisation engaged with the community.

Pride London 
From 2004 to 2012, Pride London was the charity that organised and supported the operation of the annual pride celebrations in London.

WorldPride London 2012 
At an October 2008 conference in Vancouver, InterPride accepted a bid from Pride London to host WorldPride 2012. This was to coincide with the London Olympic and Paralympic Games and during the anticipated year-long celebrations of The Queen's Diamond Jubilee. Pride London planned a parade with floats, a large performance area in Trafalgar Square with street parties in Golden Square and Soho.

However, a major sponsor withdrew support leading to the charity being unable to raise the funds necessary. Consequently, the entertainment and stages were all cut, and licence applications for street parties in Soho withdrawn. Instead, the event plans included a Pride Walk (without floats or vehicles), and a scaled-back rally in Trafalgar Square. On 5 July, the Metropolitan Police issued a licence regulations notice to all venues in Soho, reminding them that Pride London now has no licence for street events in the Soho area, and therefore venues should treat WorldPride as "any normal day".

This led to the closure of the Pride London charity in the days which followed the 2012 event. Its successor, London LGBT+ Community Pride, was formed in October 2012.

Controversy 
Business organisations running London Pride have come under criticism from socialists within the LGBT community. For instance, Hannah Dee argues that it has reached "the point that London Pride – once a militant demonstration in commemoration of the Stonewall riots – has become a corporate-sponsored event far removed from any challenge to the ongoing injustices that we [the LGBT community] face".

Awards and nominations

See also 

 Gay Liberation Front
 LGBT culture in London

References

Footnotes

Sources

External links 

 
  Pride 2018 at VisitLondon

Annual events in London
Articles containing video clips
LGBT culture in London
LGBT organisations in London
LGBT-related Internet forums
Parades in London
Pride parades in England
Summer events in England